Mulock, Ontario may refer to:

Mulock Township, a geographic township in Nipissing District
Mulock, Nipissing District, a dispersed rural community and unincorporated place in geographic Mulock Township, Nipissing District
Mulock, Grey County, a dispersed rural community and unincorporated place in the municipality of West Grey, Grey County